Malabo Airport or Saint Isabel Airport , is an airport located at Punta Europa, Bioko Island, Equatorial Guinea.

Airlines and destinations

See also

 List of airports in Equatorial Guinea
 Transport in Equatorial Guinea
 Bata Airport

References

External links 

Airports in Equatorial Guinea
Malabo